Bhakti Rathod is an Indian actress and theatre artist from Mumbai. Bhakti acted in Gujarati serial Pati Thayo Pati Gayo on Colors Gujarati. Bhakti made her debut in Dhollywood with film Haal Rupali ne peinwa opposite Hitu Kanodia in 2009. Bhakti also acted in rom-com web series.
Her latest film is an international feature film, titled 'The Last Koan' in English and Hindi, which released in 2019. She won the Gujarat Government State Award 2018 for her exceptional performance in Gujarati Movies.

Early life

Bhakti's mother is Neela Soni who is a member of Central Board of Film Certification and Vice President of BJP North Mumbai. Her father is Kannubhai Kannu Rathod. She has a sister, Chitralekha Rathod, who is also an actress and model. Bhakti completed her education from Rustomjee Cambridge International School & Junior College, Dahisar, Mumbai and University of Mumbai.

Career
Bhakti started her career as a child artist at the age of 11 in the year 2001 from hindi serials on Star Plus as Shobha Virani Choudhary , Mihir and Tulsi's daughter in Kyunki Saas Bhi Kabhi Bahu Thi and Des Mein Niklla Hoga Chand. She also starred in a number of notable Gujarati Plays namely 2Idiots, Bhari lau aankh ma zindagi, Baa Retire Thaay chhe, Adrashyam, Zero Bani Gayo Hero, Baa Mari Mother India, Family Ni Dandikuch, Saat Teri Ekvis & many more. Also a few (Gujarati) films - Aapne To Dhirubhai, Wassup Zindagi, Mr Jasoos. Bhakti got Best Theatre actress at the Tihai Gujarati Glamour Award 2014, for her play, '2 Idiots.'  Bhakti acted in Gujarati serials Pati Thayo Pati Gayo, Kanho Banyo Common Man, and wrote two Gujarati plays Mr and Miss barot & Sasu vau ni 20-20. In 2017, Bhakti acted in the first ever Gujarati web-series Kacho Papad Pako Papad for SONY LIV. In 2020, Bhakti started working in Hindi serial Bhakharwadi.

Television
 Pati Thayo Pati Gayo
 Crime Patrol – 3 episodes
 Kyunki Saas Bhi Kabhi Bahu Thi 
 Des Mein Niklla Hoga Chand
 Sajda Tere Pyaar Mein
 Preet Piyu Aane Pannaben
 Khichdi season 3 last episode as Dr 
Bhakharwadi as Urmila Thakkar 
Kuch Smiles Ho Jayein... With Alia as Urmila Thakkar
 Thoda Sa Badal Thoda Sa Pani as Anindita Basu Chatterjee
Pushpa Impossible as Sonal Parekh

Filmography
 Haal Rupali ne peinwa (2009)
 Aapne To Dhirubhai as Simran
 Wass…up! Zindagi as Purvi

References

External links
 

Indian television actresses
Indian soap opera actresses
1990 births
People from Mumbai
Living people